The Albanian Institute of Forensic Medicine is the national forensics institute of Albania organized under the Ministry of Justice, responsible for forensic psychiatry, forensic chemistry, forensic medicine and forensic genetics.

Organisation
The agency performs laboratory analyses of samples which have been taken from various types of crime scenes to solve the investigative-judicial issues of a medical and biological nature. At the same time, the Ministry of Health and Health Institutions uses data of forensic expertise to strengthen the technical-scientific discipline, improve the quality of medical-diagnostic work, preventive war against negligence and medical errors, and in the study of causes of traumas, poisonings, unexpected deaths, etc.

Main tasks
 Scientific research activity for the identification and implementation of contemporary methods in the field of forensic medicine.
 Organizing and conducting the activity of the forensic expertise services in the Republic of Albania.
 Performing forensic, pathological, toxicological, biological and psychiatric expertise, as well as other actions, according to the cases and procedures provided for in the laws of the Republic of Albania
 Coordination of the activity of this Institute with health institutions for the prevention of criminal offenses, endangering the life and health of patients.
 Continuous scientific training and qualification of forensic specialists.
 Coordination of activity with international counterpart institutions.

See also
 Ministry of Justice

References

Forensics organizations